DeSoto County High School is a public high school located in Arcadia, Florida. It is part of the DeSoto County School District.

Notable alumni
 Ed Sharkey, professional football player
 Jim Yarbrough, professional football player

References

Educational institutions in the United States with year of establishment missing
Public high schools in Florida
Schools in DeSoto County, Florida